Jayantha Dhanapala (born 30 December 1938) is a Sri Lankan diplomat who serves as member of the Board of Sponsors of The Bulletin of the Atomic Scientists and was a governing board member of the Stockholm International Peace Research Institute. Dhanapala is also a distinguished member of Constitutional Council of Sri Lanka and he is the Senior Special Advisor on Foreign Relations to President Maithripala Sirisena, and was Sri Lanka's official candidate for the post of Secretary-General of the United Nations, before withdrawing from the race on 29 September 2006. From 2007 he has been the President of the Pugwash Conferences on Science and World Affairs.

Early years in Sri Lanka

Dhanapala was born in Sri Lanka on 30 December 1938. His family hails from the town of Matale. Dhanapala was educated at prestigious Trinity College in Kandy. He gained a reputation as an all rounder as a schoolboy and was awarded the Ryde Gold Medal in 1956. At the age of 17 Jayantha Dhanapala won a contest with an essay titled "The World We Want" and travelled to the US where he met Senator John F. Kennedy and President Dwight D. Eisenhower.

Diplomatic career
He entered the Sri Lankan diplomatic service and served in London, Beijing, Washington, D.C., New Delhi and Geneva. Dhanapala was appointed Ambassador in Geneva (1984–87)—he was also accredited to the UN and was appointed Sri Lanka's Ambassador to the United States of America based in Washington D.C. from 1995-97.

Dhanapala was widely acclaimed for his Presidency of the 1995 Nuclear Non-Proliferation Treaty Review and Extension Conference, a landmark event in disarmament history, because of his crafting of a package of decisions balancing the twin objectives of nuclear non-proliferation and nuclear disarmament and the concerns of the nuclear weapon states and the non-nuclear weapon states which was adopted without a vote. The New York Times observed that Jayantha Dhanapala 'was a diplomat mostly unknown outside the arms-control world until he was elected to preside over this conference.'

Under-Secretary-General at the UN
Dhanapala was hand picked by UN Secretary-General, Kofi Annan to take on the challenging job of Under Secretary General to re-establish the Department of Disarmament after the UN reforms of 1997 (1998–2003). During his tenure he piloted the UN role in arresting the proliferation of small arms and light weapons, anti-personnel landmines, conventional weapons, and weapons of mass destruction while reinforcing existing norms and norm-building in other areas such as missiles. He also broke new ground both in-house in taking managerial initiatives in gender mainstreaming and in work-life issues, as well as in the disarmament field by innovating the exchange of weapons for a development programme in Albania and other areas, and also in the cross-sectoral linking of disarmament with development, the environment and peace education programmes.

Dhanapala was appointed Secretary-General of the Secretariat for Coordinating the Peace Process (SCOPP) in Sri Lanka from 2004 - 2005. He was also Senior Special Advisor to both Presidents Chandrika Bandaranaike Kumaratunga and Mahinda Rajapakse during the period 2005-2007. Senior Special Advisor on Foreign Relations to President Maithripala Sirisena 12 January 2015

Candidate for the post of UN Secretary-General
Sri Lanka's civil war hobbled Dhanapala's candidacy for United Nations Secretary-General. The opposition parties in Sri Lanka joined hands with the government on the day that his candidacy was announced.

Honors and awards

 Doctor of Letters honoris causa by the University of Peradeniya, Sri Lanka (2000)
 Doctor of Humane Letters Honoris causa by the Monterey Institute of International Studies, U.S. (2001)
 Doctor of Science in the Social Sciences by the University of Southampton, UK (2003)
 Doctor of Letters (Honoris causa) by the Sabaragamuwa University of Sri Lanka (2003)
 Doctorate (Doctor Honoris Causa) from the Dubna International University of Nature, Society and Man in Russia (2009)
 Sean MacBride Prize - From the International Peace Bureau - Awarded in November, (2007)

Bibliography
Multilateral Diplomacy and the NPT: An Insiders’ Account
Jayantha Dhanapala with R. Rydell, Geneva: United Nations Institute for Disarmament Research, 2005
Regional Approaches to Disarmament, Security and Stability
Jayantha Dhanapala (ed.), Geneva: UNIDIR, 1993, published for UNIDIR by Dartmouth (Aldershot)
The United Nations, Disarmament and Security: Evolution and Prospects Jayantha Dhanapala (ed.), Geneva: UNIDIR, 1991
China and the Third World Jayantha Dhanapala, New Delhi: Vikas, 1985

References

 Dhanapala quits Cargills Board to take up Senior Presidential Advisor role  January 14, 2015
 Dhanapala quits Cargills Board to take up Senior Presidential Advisor role  January 14, 2015
 Honorary Professor, Biography Professor Jayantha Dhanapala

External links

 
 Jayantha Dhanapala Blog

Speeches
 Challenging 'the Very Existence of WMD'
 Gender Perspectives on Disarmament
 Sri Lanka Peace Process: Problems and Prospects
 Comprehensive Test Ban Treaty - EIF Conference Speeches

Living people
1938 births
Sinhalese civil servants
Sri Lankan diplomats
Alumni of the University of Ceylon (Peradeniya)
Permanent Representatives of Sri Lanka to the United Nations
Ambassadors of Sri Lanka to the United States
Ambassadors of Sri Lanka to Switzerland
Under-Secretaries-General of the United Nations
Alumni of Trinity College, Kandy